Oregon Route 31 is a state highway in the U.S. state of Oregon that runs between the Central Oregon cities of La Pine and Lakeview.  OR 31 traverses most of the Fremont Highway No. 19 of the Oregon state highway system, named after John C. Frémont.  The entire length of OR 31 is part of the Outback Scenic Byway, though the byway extends further south beyond the end of OR 31, to the California border.

Route description

Oregon 31 runs northwest-southeast, but is signed north–south. It is a two-lane rural road for its entire length. The northern terminus of the highway is at an intersection with U.S. Route 97 south of the city of La Pine. From there, the highway heads southeast, passing near the natural attractions of Big Hole, Hole-in-the-Ground, and Fort Rock State Natural Area. The route turns briefly east, passing by Paulina Marsh and Silver Lake and through the community of Silver Lake; it then turns south, goes over Picture Rock Pass, and passes by the Summer Lake Wildlife Area, then through the community of Summer Lake and by the lake of the same name. The road then runs east near the south shore of Summer Lake, then southeast through Paisley. Near the southern end of Abert Lake, and north of Lakeview, the highway ends at an intersection with U.S. Route 395.  

A previous routing from a 1916 map shows the highway's northern terminus near Millican on U.S. 20, proceeding down Forest Road 25, then down Forest Road 18/Cabin Lake Road to the community of Fort Rock and continuing south on Pitcher Lane and Picture Lane to Silver Lake.

Major intersections

References

External links
Outback Scenic Byway

031
Transportation in Deschutes County, Oregon
Transportation in Klamath County, Oregon
Transportation in Lake County, Oregon